Bloodrock is the debut from the Fort Worth, Texas, hard rock band Bloodrock, released on 16 March 1970 by label Capitol Records. The cover art was designed by producer Terry Knight. AllMusic described the album in terms of hard rock and early "proto-metal", akin to Deep Purple. The album "remains a cult favorite among fans of hard rock."

Track listing

Personnel
 Lee Pickens – lead guitar, backing vocals
 Nick Taylor – rhythm guitar, backing vocals
 Stephen Hill – keyboards, backing vocals
 Ed Grundy – bass guitar, backing vocals
 Jim Rutledge – drums, lead vocals

Charts

References

1970 debut albums
Bloodrock albums
Albums produced by Terry Knight
Capitol Records albums